Gündoğan may refer to:

People
İlkay Gündoğan (born 1990), German footballer of Turkish descent
Nilüfer Gündoğan (born 1977), Dutch politician of Kurdish-Turkish descent
Umut Gündoğan (born 1990), Turkish footballer

Places
Gündoğan, Buharkent, village in Turkey
Gündoğan, Ceyhan, village in Turkey
Gündoğan, Cide, village in Turkey
Gündoğan, Gönen, village in Turkey
Gündoğan, Köşk, village in Turkey
Gündoğan, Polatlı, village in Turkey

Turkish-language surnames